is a stop on the Odawara Line by Odakyu Electric Railway and is located in Setagaya, Tokyo, Japan.

Station layout
The station, which sits on an elevated structure, features four tracks and two side platforms. Express trains typically bypass the station on the two innermost tracks while local and semi-express trains typically stop at the station on the two outermost tracks.

Before tracks were quadrupled on this section of the Odawara Line in 2004, the station featured two tracks and two side platforms. The station was also located at street level.

History
The station opened on 1 April 1927. The station is surrounded by a residential neighborhood and is well known for the "Ultraman Shopping Street" that extends north from the station. The head office of Tsuburaya Productions - the studio that produces Ultraman - was located nearby the station, and the street was named in 2006 from the connection.

Station numbering was introduced in January 2014 with Soshigaya-Ōkura being assigned station number OH13.

References

Railway stations in Japan opened in 1927
Odakyu Odawara Line
Stations of Odakyu Electric Railway
Railway stations in Tokyo